Z Rock is an American comedy television series, which aired on the IFC in the United States. The show is a semi-scripted comedy and is based on the double life of a Brooklyn band, ZO2. By night, they are a hard rock band but, to pay the bills, they are the "Z Brothers" by day, playing at children's birthday parties. ZO2 consists of brothers Paulie Z, David Z and their childhood friend Joey Cassata portraying fictionalized versions of themselves.

The series was filmed and produced in New York City by Mark Mark Productions.

Characters

Major Characters

Guest Stars
Joan Rivers as herself
John Popper as himself
Marky Ramone as himself
Dave Navarro as himself
Dee Snider as himself
Bethenny Frankel as Bethenny the chef
Sebastian Bach as himself
Dave Attell as himself
Alison Becker as Joey's girlfriend Becky
Gilbert Gottfried as himself
Patrice O'Neal as Darren the stage manager
Warren Sapp as himself
Bonnie Bernstein as herself
Melissa Rivers as herself
Daryl Hall as himself
Constantine Maroulis as himself
Chris Barron as himself
Chris Jericho as himself
Michael McDerman as Stylist 
Greg Giraldo as Harry Bronstein
Jim Norton as himself
Jeff Ross as himself
Eddie Trunk as himself
Steel Panther as themselves
Frank Stallone as himself
Eddie Ojeda
Jay Jay French
Joe Derosa as Squirt Reynolds
Carmine Appice
Jay Decay

Episodes

Season 1 (2008)

Season 2 (2009)

References

External links
 Official ZO2/Z Rock Website
 
 ZO2's MySpace

IFC (American TV channel) original programming
2000s American musical comedy television series
2008 American television series debuts
2009 American television series endings